The men's alpine skiing combined event was part of the alpine skiing at the 1948 Winter Olympics programme. It was the second appearance of the event. The competition consisted of a downhill race held on Monday, 2 February and two slalom heats held on Wednesday, 4 February 1948. Seventy-nine alpine skiers from 24 nations competed.

Results

Downhill

The only men's downhill race was held on Monday, 2 February. Seventy-eight of the 102 finishers of this downhill race also competed in the first slalom heat of the combined event.

Slalom
The two-run slalom race of the combined event was held on Wednesday, 4 February.

* 5 seconds penalty included.

Final standings

References

External links
 Official Olympic Report
 

Men's alpine skiing at the 1948 Winter Olympics